Chaetopleura pertusa, the orange hairy chiton, is a species of chitons in the family Chaetopleuridae. It is a marine mollusc. It is endemic to South Africa.

Distribution
This species is found around the South African coast from Saldanha Bay to Kosi Bay, subtidally to at least 20 m.

Description
The orange hairy chiton is a distinctive chiton  with pink or orange mottled valves. The valves have a granular texture and are surrounded by a wide girdle of pink or orange. The girdle has branched bristles and short hairs. The animal may grow up to 50 mm in total length.

Ecology
The orange hairy chiton lives under rocks during the day but emerges at night.

References

Chaetopleuridae
Molluscs of Africa
Chitons described in 1847